Phaleriini is a tribe of darkling beetles in the family Tenebrionidae. There are at least two genera and about six described species in Phaleriini.

Genera
These two genera belong to the tribe Phaleriini:
 Phaleria Latrielle, 1802 i c g b
 Phaleromela Reitter, 1916 g b
Data sources: i = ITIS, c = Catalogue of Life, g = GBIF, b = Bugguide.net

References

Further reading

 
 
 
 
 
 
 
 
 
 
 

Tenebrionidae